Franco Maria Malfatti (13 June 1927 – 10 December 1991) was an Italian politician who served as the 3rd President of the European Commission from 1970 to 1972. He served at Italian level as Italian Minister of Foreign Affairs from 1979 to 1980 and Italian Minister of Education from 1973 to 1978.

Biography
Malfatti was born in Rome to parents who were from the province of Rieti. He was an important member of the governing council of Democrazia Cristiana (the Christian Democratic party) in which he became chief of political bureau, and covered several institutional charges.

In Democrazia Cristiana, he was a member of Dossetti's lobby, together with Amintore Fanfani, Aldo Moro, and Giorgio La Pira. In 1951 he was elected national representative for young members; in 1958 he was elected deputy for the district of Rieti and Umbria. He served as minister for Foreign Affairs (1979–1980), Finance (1978–1979), Education, Industry, State holdings, and Telecommunications.

He was also the third President of the European Commission from 1970 to 1972. The "Malfatti Commission" began as the integration process was relaunched: the EC adopting a financial framework and competing the single market. There was also the beginnings of political cooperation, monetary cooperation and of enlargement as talks opened with Denmark, Ireland, Norway and the United Kingdom. He resigned from this post in 1972 to run for office in Italy.

In the 1980s he was chief of the Italian delegation in the European Parliament. Politically close to Aldo Moro's lobby, Malfatti was among the participants in Bilderberg meetings.

References

 

1927 births
1991 deaths
Politicians from Rome
Education ministers of Italy
Foreign ministers of Italy
Finance ministers of Italy
Christian Democracy (Italy) politicians
20th-century Italian politicians
Presidents of the European Commission
Italian European Commissioners
European Commissioners 1970–1972